The 2020 Denmark Open (officially known as the Danisa Denmark Open presented by Victor for sponsorship reasons) was a badminton tournament which took place at the Odense Sports Park in Denmark from 13 to 18 October 2020. It had a total purse of $750,000. Some badminton powerhouse countries such as China, Indonesia, South Korea, Malaysia, and Thailand did not send their representatives to the event in the light of the COVID 19 pandemic, causing a less competitive event in which most top players did not participate. Some Japanese players, including Kento Momota, did not participate as well.

Tournament 
The 2020 Denmark Open became the sixth tournament of the 2020 BWF World Tour following the postponement of 17 tournaments due to the ongoing coronavirus outbreak. It was a part of the Denmark Open championships, which had been held since 1935. This tournament was organized by Badminton Denmark and sanctioned by the BWF.

Venue 
This international tournament was held at Odense Sports Park in Odense, Denmark.

Point distribution 
Below is the point distribution for each phase of the tournament based on the BWF points system for the BWF World Tour Super 750 event.

Prize money 
The total prize money for this tournament was US$750,000. Distribution of prize money was in accordance with BWF regulations.

Men's singles

Seeds

 Kento Momota (withdrew)
 Chou Tien-chen (semifinals)
 Anders Antonsen (champion)
 Kanta Tsuneyama (withdrew)
 Srikanth Kidambi (quarterfinals)
 Kenta Nishimoto (semifinals)
 Rasmus Gemke (final)
 Jan Ø. Jørgensen (quarterfinals)

Finals

Top half

Section 1

Section 2

Bottom half

Section 3

Section 4

Women's singles

Seeds

 Akane Yamaguchi (withdrew)
 Nozomi Okuhara (champion)
 Carolina Marín (final)
 Michelle Li (semifinals)
 Sayaka Takahashi (withdrew)
 Beiwen Zhang (quarterfinals)
 Mia Blichfeldt (quarterfinals)
 Aya Ohori (withdrew)

Finals

Top half

Section 1

Section 2

Bottom half

Section 3

Section 4

Men's doubles

Seeds

 Takeshi Kamura / Keigo Sonoda (withdrew)
 Hiroyuki Endo / Yuta Watanabe (withdrew)
 Takuro Hoki / Yugo Kobayashi (withdrew)
 Kim Astrup / Anders Skaarup Rasmussen (second round)
 Marcus Ellis / Chris Langridge (champions)
 Mark Lamsfuß / Marvin Seidel (second round)
 Vladimir Ivanov / Ivan Sozonov (final)
 Akira Koga / Taichi Saito (withdrew)

Finals

Top half

Section 1

Section 2

Bottom half

Section 3

Section 4

Women's doubles

Seeds

 Yuki Fukushima / Sayaka Hirota (champions)
 Mayu Matsumoto / Wakana Nagahara (final)
 Nami Matsuyama / Chiharu Shida (withdrew)
 Gabriela Stoeva / Stefani Stoeva (semifinals)
 Chloe Birch / Lauren Smith (quarterfinals)
 Maiken Fruergaard / Sara Thygesen (quarterfinals)
 Rachel Honderich / Kristen Tsai (withdrew)
 Émilie Lefel / Anne Tran (quarterfinals)

Finals

Top half

Section 1

Section 2

Bottom half

Section 3

Section 4

Mixed doubles

Seeds

 Yuta Watanabe / Arisa Higashino (withdrew)
 Marcus Ellis / Lauren Smith (semifinals)
 Chris Adcock / Gabby Adcock (final)
 Mark Lamsfuß / Isabel Herttrich (champions)
 Rodion Alimov / Alina Davletova (first round)
 Takuro Hoki / Wakana Nagahara (withdrew)
 Mathias Christiansen / Alexandra Bøje (quarterfinals) 
 Joshua Hurlburt-Yu / Josephine Wu (withdrew)

Finals

Top half

Section 1

Section 2

Bottom half

Section 3

Section 4

References

External links 
 Official Website
 Tournament Link

Denmark Open
Denmark Open
Denmark Open
Denmark Open